Two-Shade, a 2009 jazz trio album, is Gerald Clayton's discographic debut as a leader, featuring long-time friends and collaborators Joe Sanders on double bass and Justin Brown on drums. The project was fan-funded through ArtistShare.

Track list
"Boogablues"
"Trapped In Dream"
"Two Heads One Pillow"
"Peace For The Moment"
"All of You"
"Interlude- Love All Around"
"Casiotone Pothole"
"One Two You"
"Sunny Day Go"
"Scrimmage"
"Interlude - You're Out"
"Con Alma" (Dizzy Gillespie)

Concept
The musical concept of the album is "about taking two opposite ideas and putting them together in order to create a new sound", as "people become close minded towards music that they’ve never even listened to, because it’s classified under a certain genre".

Reception
According to All About Jazz, a critically acclaimed jazz music website, Clayton has not only learned from the great Jazz masters, but embodies their spirit and language. The review characterized the results "not only stunning but fresh, original and distinctly the music of today", proclaiming him "a leader of the new generation of young Jazz musicians". In a New York Times album review, he was found to display qualities of "a grand and amiable virtuosity", along with "unusual polish and self-assurance". A 90% rating was awarded by specialist website Jazz.com for this "must-hear debut release" on which "Clayton's apparent skills as a composer foreshadow the impact that he will have on jazz in the years to come". JazzWeek Radio, determining national airplay for the top-fifty jazz and smooth-jazz recordings in USA and Canada, through leading industry monitor Mediaguide, listed Two-Shade as 12th in its chart for August 10, 2009, debuting as 25th on its July 1 release.
In November 2010, Gerald Clayton was interviewed by Linus Wyrsch on "The Jazz Hole" for breakthruradio.com with a focus on his Two-Shade release. - Gerald Clayton Interview by breakthruradio.com

References

Jazz albums by American artists
2009 albums